The Cårrujavrit Hydroelectric Power Station ( or Čårrujavrit kraftverk) is a hydroelectric power station in the municipality of Kvænangen in Troms county, Norway. The plant is controlled by Kvænangen Kraftverk AS, with a 48.2% share owned by Troms Kraft.

See also

References

Hydroelectric power stations in Norway
Troms
Energy infrastructure completed in 1990
1990 establishments in Norway
Dams in Norway